The Modern Sound of Mr. B is a 1964 studio album by the American singer Billy Eckstine. It was produced by Quincy Jones.

Reception
The album was chosen as a "Special Merit Pick" by Billboard magazine upon its release in June 1964. BillBoard commented that "Few singers manage in their careers to achieve a truly distinctive style, but "Mr B." has a style strictly his own." Stereo Review said of the album that "His vocal sound is warm and rich, his polish is obvious. This album is titled "The Modern Sound of Mr. B." It is a misnomer. Eckstine's sound is the same as it always was — like a 45-rpm Sarah Vaughan record played at 33 1/3".

Track listing 
 "Mister Kicks" - 2:20
 "People" (Jule Styne, Bob Merrill) - 3:13
 "Satin Doll" (Duke Ellington, Johnny Mercer, Billy Strayhorn) - 3:18
 "A Beautiful Friendship" (Donald Kahn, Stanley Styne) - 3:25
 "Wives and Lovers" (Burt Bacharach, Hal David) - 2:30
 "What Are You Afraid of" - 2:26
 "Sweet Georgia Brown" (Ben Bernie, Kenneth Casey, Maceo Pinkard) - 1:55
 "A Garden in the Rain" (James Dyrenforth, Carroll Gibbons) - 2:50
 "Wouldn't It Be Loverly" (Frederick Loewe, Alan Jay Lerner) - 4:07
 "Poor Fool" - 3:00
 "Our Once Happy Love" - 2:58
 "Wanted" - 2:47

Personnel 
 Billy Eckstine - Vocals
 Quincy Jones - Producer

References

1964 albums
Albums produced by Quincy Jones
Billy Eckstine albums
Mercury Records albums